Brampton West—Mississauga was a federal electoral district in Ontario, Canada, that was represented in the House of Commons of Canada from 1997 to 2004. This riding was created in 1996, from parts of Brampton riding.

The electoral district was abolished in 2003 when it was redistributed between Brampton West, Mississauga—Brampton South and  Mississauga—Streetsville ridings.

Members of Parliament
The riding has elected the following Members of Parliament:

Election results

|-

|}

|}

See also 
 List of Canadian federal electoral districts
 Past Canadian electoral districts

External links 
 Federal riding history from the Library of Parliament

Former federal electoral districts of Ontario
Politics of Brampton
Politics of Mississauga